The University of Hawaiʻi Rainbow Warrior Marching Band is a marching band for the University of Hawaiʻi at Mānoa.

History
The first band at the  University of Hawaiʻi at Mānoa was established in 1923. The only university marching band in the state of Hawaii and the biggest student organization on campus performs pregame and halftime at all the Hawaiʻi Warriors football home games at Aloha Stadium, including bowl games, as well as pep band at home games for basketball and volleyball.

General information
The UH marching band consists of over 220 members. Under the direction of Adam Kehl, it is considered a one-credit graded course at the University of Hawaiʻi at Mānoa. Students enrolled receive a tuition waiver, with rehearsals three days a week.
The band played at the 2008 Sugar Bowl.

Instrumentation includes approximately 19 flutes and piccolos, 10 clarinets, 30 alto/tenor saxophones, 20 French horns, 30 trumpets, 22 trombones, 10 baritones, 18 tubas, 30 percussion and 14 color guard.

References
University of Hawaii Bands website

External links
 University of Hawaii Bands Website

Mountain West Conference marching bands
University of Hawaiʻi
Musical groups established in 1923
1923 establishments in Hawaii